The Suit of Goblets, more often known in modern times as the Suit of Cups, is one of four suits of tarot which, collectively, make up the Minor Arcana. They are sometimes referred to as chalices. Like the other suits of the Minor Arcana, it contains fourteen cards: ace (one), two through ten, page, knight, queen and king. Historically, the suit represented the First Estate (the Clergy). Tarot cards were originally designed for card play and are still used throughout much of Europe to play various Tarot card games. However, in English-speaking countries, where the games are largely unknown, Tarot cards came to be utilized primarily for divinatory purposes. In card games, the equivalent suit is Cups.

Divinatory and occult meanings
In tarot, the element of cups is water, and the suit of cups pertains to situations and events of an emotional nature – in contradistinction to physical, or mindful, or creative natures; physical would refer to the understanding with the five senses, mindfulness would refer to mental constructs and logical sequences, and creative would refer to the agility of transcending limits, if so desired). As such, when the tarot is used in divination, many cups signify an emotional issue or love situation, or some event that affects the querent emotionally.  The water astrological signs are Cancer, Scorpio and Pisces. Additionally, cups were the symbol of the clergy in feudal times, and thus cup cards can also be interpreted as having to do with spiritual or religious matters.

Cards in the suit of Cups

Ace of Cups: Aces always indicate beginnings. Here the ace of cups indicates a new beginning of an emotional nature. It can signify the birth of a child, or the beginning of a love situation that affects us deeply. It is generally a card of happiness, and the beginning of many blessings. A new business, a relationship, success on the path is inevitable.
Two of Cups: Two of any suit indicates duality. Here it indicates two minds and hearts coming together and functioning as one. The card portrays a young man and a woman each bearing a cup, as if presenting it to one another. Above is the red lion of strength and courage. 
Three of Cups: The three Graces dance and cavort, each maiden bearing a cup. It indicates a time of merriment and celebration.
Four of Cups: A young man sits under a tree thinking and sitting crosslegged, but this youth is not serene. He seems dissatisfied with the three cups before him. A hand from a cloud offers him a fourth cup, but the youth shows no interest. It indicates a period of ennui and boredom, where nothing seems to be satisfying. 
Five of Cups: A hooded figure with bowed head seems to mourn the 3 cups spilled before him. Behind the cloaked figure stand two cups, upright.  The 5 of any suit can be considered difficult. Here it indicates hopes that have been dashed, or mourning over something that is lost. The hooded figure remains unaware of the two cups still standing behind—so the situation is not completely hopeless. 
Six of Cups: Two youths play in a garden, surrounded by six cups.  This card can indicate happy memories, as well as a certain clinging to the past and how things used to be. It can also indicate an invitation or gift coming from someone in your past. 
Seven of Cups: A young person sees seven cups among the clouds and visions therein. On one cup is the perfect lover or mate all people idealize. Another cup shows riches, another the cloaked soul of the querent about to be revealed, another castles. Other cups show a red dragon of inflamed passion and emotion, as well as a snake arising from another cup. 
Eight of Cups: Eight cups are arranged in a row. A figure leaves these cups behind as if beginning a journey. An indifferent moon looks down upon the traveler. The traveler is in a good situation where there is much promise and much to offer, but chooses to set out for the unknown. It indicates a restlessness and wanderlust as well as overlooking the good we already possess, in the hopes of finding something else. 
Nine of Cups: This is known as the "wish" card. A well fed, self-satisfied individual sits with nine cups behind. 
Ten of Cups: A husband and wife join arms looking up at the rainbow over their house. Two young children dance. Ten cups are seen among the rainbow. 
Page of Cups: A dreamy youth holds a cup from wherein a fish pokes its head. This indicates a versatile individual, one who have the gift of intuition and insight. The card indicates a youth with a love for the arts, poetry and music and may be very fond of dancing. It indicates ease in ones affairs as well as news of enjoyment and entertainment. 
Knight of Cups: A young man on a horse with a winged helmet offers a cup. The card can indicate a sensitive male, unmarried, a suitor who seeks the hand of a lady. He is honest and truthful, as well as is heartfelt. It can also indicate a matter of an emotional nature that is occurring in the querent's life. 
Queen of Cups: A queen on her throne at the seaside holds a cup she looks into. She sees visions within. It indicates a woman who has the gift of intuition and is able to offer good advice. 
King of Cups: A king holding a scepter floats upon the water. It indicates someone who is kind, even tempered, balanced and wise. He may be a member of the clergy, or a counselor, professor or psychologist, doctor. He is a symbol of quiet strength and is calming and reassuring.

Card images in the Rider–Waite tarot deck

See also 
 Cups - suit of Latin (Italian/Spanish) playing cards

References

 The Tarot Unveiled by Arthur Edward Waite